James Brain Keysor (December 10, 1927 Salt Lake City – February 13, 2014 Capistrano Beach, California) served, from 1970 to 1974, in the California State Legislature, representing the 41st State Assembly District.

Career 
During World War II, Keysor served in the United States Army.  Had earned a degree at the University of California, Los Angeles. He was a member of the Church of Jesus Christ of Latter-day Saints and also a leader in the Boy Scouts of America.

When he began campaigning for office in the California State Assembly in 1969, he had been President of the Keysor-Century Corporation — parent of Century Record Manufacturing Company — both of which had been founded by his father, James Bernard ("Bud") Keysor Jr. (1906–2000).

References

United States Army personnel of World War II
Latter Day Saints from California
American music industry executives
1927 births
2014 deaths
Politicians from Salt Lake City
Democratic Party members of the California State Assembly